Sweater is a Bengali family drama film directed by Shieladitya Moulik and produced by PSS Entertainments, P&P Entertainment and Pramod Films. This film was released on 29 March 2019. Anindya Chattopadhyay and Ranajoy Bhattacharjee are the music directors of the movie.

Plot
The film revolves around Tuku, a simple girl whose parents are worried because she doesn't have any qualities and not getting married. But her sister is a smart and talented girl. Many families came to see Tuku but each time she was rejected. She has an ongoing affair with Pablo, a rock star who is not willing to commit fully yet. Her rebellious sister is also in a relationship with a boy called Akash and regularly gets gifts from him, but refuses to let him know that she is interested in him so that he would chase her. One day a family comes to see Tuku. But before the marriage her would be mother-in-law places a condition on her that she has to be an expert in knitting. Eventually she goes to her aunt's house to learn this art. There she meets Shamyo, a violin player. In spite of being a cancer patient, his optimism towards life inspires Tuku a lot and transforms her into a confident and new person. On the other hand, though Akash is invited to her home, he refuses to marry her sister as he had realised that Tuku's sister had only used him for a give and take relationship. When Tuku returns to her home, she refuses her marriage proposal and pays back Pablo as well for the cutlets he used to feed her for two years.

Soundtrack 
Preme Pora Baron sung by Lagnajita Chakraborty was the most popular song of this film. Preme Pora Baron Lyrics was written by Ranajoy Bhattacharjee.

Cast
 Ishaa Saha as Tulika a.k.a. Tuku
 June Maliah as Mother in law of Tuku
 Sreelekha Mitra as Tuku's aunt
 Kharaj Mukherjee as Mahadeb a.k.a. Tuku's father
 Saurav Das as Pablo, Tuku's boyfriend
 Anuradha Mukherjee as Sree, sister of Tuku
 Riju Biswas as Akash
 Farhan Imroze as Shamyo
 Sidhu Ray as Tuku's aunt's husband

See also 
 Mukherjee Dar Bou, 2019 Bengali film

References

External links
 

2019 films
Indian drama films
Bengali-language Indian films
2010s Bengali-language films
2019 drama films